During the 2004–05 season, League 2, which is in fact the third tier of the Iranian football league system, was organised in two groups each of ten teams. At the end of the season Shahrdari Langarud and Pegah Khozestan as group winners were promoted to the Azadegan League.

Final classification

Group 1

Group 2

Promotion playoff

Nassaji Mazandaran in Group 1 and Ararat in Group 2 as 2nd-placed team faced play-off 11th-placed team of Azadegan League 2004/05, Niroye Zamini in Group 1 and Ekbatan in Group 2

Relegation playoff

Fajr Sepah Tehran in Group 1 and Chooka Talesh in Group 2 as 9th-placed team faced play-off winners of 2004–05 Iran Football's 3rd Division, Zob Ahan Ardabil in Group 1 and Sepahan Novin in Group 2.

See also 
 2004–05 Hazfi Cup
 2004–05 Iran Pro League
 2004–05 Azadegan League
 2004–05 Iranian Futsal Super League

League 2 (Iran) seasons
3